Stephen William Boyd is a Professor of Tourism at the University of Ulster in Northern Ireland.

Career
Prior to taking this position he was a senior lecturer at Staffordshire University in Stoke-on-Trent, England and at Otago University in Dunedin, New Zealand. He has co-authored the book Heritage Tourism, which appeared as #2 among Top 10 Academic Bestsellers of the Times Higher Education magazine in May 2008.

References

Year of birth missing (living people)
Living people
British social scientists
Academics of Ulster University
Academics of Staffordshire University
Academic staff of the University of Otago
Tourism researchers